"Stuttering" is a song by Canadian singer–songwriter Fefe Dobson from her second (released) studio album, Joy. It was produced by J. R. Rotem, and co-written by Dobson, Rotem, and Claude Kelly. The song was released as a single on September 7, 2010, by 21 Music and The Island Def Jam Music Group and officially impacted mainstream radio on October 12, 2010. The song has achieved success in Canada, becoming Dobson's first top ten hit on the Canadian Hot 100 and being certified Platinum by Music Canada. The single has received airplay on Radio Disney. A remix featuring rapper Pusha T was released in November 2010.

Reception 
"Stuttering" has garnered generally positive reviews from music critics. AllMusic's Matthew Chisling wrote that "Stuttering" "proves [Dobson is] on top of the pop market, with some immaculate writing and production". Complimenting Dobson's vocal performance, Sputnikmusic wrote, "she belts out impressively high and quick notes during the chorus with no real effort at all, because the girl can sing."

Chart performance
"Stuttering" has charted on the Canadian Hot 100, debuting at number 78 on the issue dated November 6, 2010. It ultimately peaked at number 10 on the chart, making it Dobson's first top ten on the new chart format and first top ten since 2004. It also is her highest-charting single from Joy, outpeaking the prior single, "Ghost", which peaked at number 14.

In the United States, the song peaked at number 65 on the Hot 100 Airplay chart and at number 39 on the Pop Songs chart, marking her first entry on the latter since "Everything" in 2004.

Music video
The video was directed by Alan Ferguson. It premiered October 29, 2010. The video begins with Dobson questioning a hotel manager (a French cowboy) about her boyfriend and she thinks he is covering for him, she then sees a man she believes is him. As she walks to his hotel room she sings. Once she gets there she puts on a leather jacket (owned by the man's girlfriend), then the girlfriend comes into the room and the music stops while she says, "Who the hell are you!" and Dobson retorts, "Who the hell are you?" Just then the man gets out of the shower and Dobson realizes that she does not know him. She then proceeds to run out of the hotel room and takes off the jacket, when the French cowboy grabs her and yells at her for 'bringing a lot of business but not paying' and she starts to remember a party that she went to and cheated on her boyfriend. The video than flashes back to Dobson being in a car that crashed causing her to have amnesia. As she gets out of the overheated car and walks away, she talks about amnesia leading "to a really bad stomachache" and admits that she is the one "that needed to be held accountable".

Credits and personnel
Fefe Dobson – lead vocals, songwriting
J. R. Rotem – songwriting, production, instruments
Claude Kelly – backing vocals, songwriting, vocal production
Ben "Bengineer" Chang – recording
Serban Ghenea – mixing
John Hanes – mix engineer
Tim Roberts – assistant engineer
Emanuel Kiriakou – guitar

Source:

Charts

Weekly charts

Year-end charts

Certifications

Release history

References

Fefe Dobson songs
2010 singles
Songs written by Fefe Dobson
Songs written by Claude Kelly
Songs written by J. R. Rotem
Song recordings produced by J. R. Rotem
2010 songs
Music videos directed by Alan Ferguson (director)